Jama pri Dvoru is a settlement in the Municipality of Žužemberk in southeastern Slovenia. It lies on the right bank of the Krka River opposite Dvor. The area is part of the historical region of Lower Carniola. The municipality is now included in the Southeast Slovenia Statistical Region.

Name
The name of the settlement was changed from Jama to Jama pri Dvoru (literally, 'Jama near Dvor') in 1953.

Notable people
Notable people that were born or lived in Jama pri Dvoru include:
 Fran Bradač (1885–1970), classical philologist and translator

References

External links

Jama pri Dvoru at Geopedia

Populated places in the Municipality of Žužemberk